"Le Désir de peindre" ("The Desire to Paint") is a prose poem written by Charles Baudelaire. It is the thirty-sixth poem of the collection Le Spleen de Paris (1869).

References 

The information in this article is based on that in its French equivalent.

1869 poems
Poetry by Charles Baudelaire